Resurrection is the tenth album by heavy metal band Venom. It was released on SPV/Steamhammer in 2000. It is the last Venom album to feature original member Mantas on guitar.

Track listing

Credits
Cronos – bass guitar, vocals
Mantas – guitar
Antton – drums

References

External links
Venomcollector.com

2000 albums
Venom (band) albums
SPV/Steamhammer albums